École Secondaire Confédération is a French as first language high school located in Welland, Ontario, Canada. It was the first French High School in Southern Ontario and serves the French population of the Niagara Region. The school has been particularly renowned for its academic strengths in Business and Marketing as well as its great reputation in Hospitality/Tourism. 

Its feeder schools are:
 École élémentaire Champlain (Welland)
 École élémentaire Nouvel Horizon (Welland)
 École élémentaire L'Héritage (St. Catharines)
 École élémentaire LaMarsh (Niagara Falls)

History

École secondaire Confédération takes its roots in 1955 when the nuns of Sacré-Coeur established a 9th and 10th grade in their French parochial school, offering French scholastic studies. However, students at that time, were required to pay in order to attend the school and after completing their 10th grade, had to follow their studies and adapt themselves to a completely Anglophone school. In 1959, École secondaire Sacré-Coeur was founded, organized solely by these nuns and soon after, Eastdale Secondary School began offering French courses to its students. In 1964 École secondaire Sacré-Coeur was officially built on Tanguay Street leading to its being bought and adopted by the Conseil Scolaire du Niagara-Sud in 1968 – École secondaire Confédération was officially founded. At this point, the school housed more than 500 students and 37 professors serving Welland, Niagara Falls, Port Colborne and St. Catharines. Respective of its heritage, the school adopted a new motto; "Double héritage, double effort".

In 1971 École secondaire Confédération's statistics grew exponentially, now serving nearly 900 students with 50 professors,  leading to the construction of the south wing where a variety of workshops and classes are added. Finally, in 1999 Confédération accommodated grade 7 and 8 students residing in the area – this program proved very successful. Today, Confédération remains a unique French public secondary school offering a reputation and ambiance based on morals, culture, academics and athletics. The school prides itself on offering "une education sans comparaison" or "unparalleled education".

Academics

The school offers 129 different courses from grades 7 to 12. In addition to academic courses, the school boasts a variety of specialized classes such as Business and Marketing, Hospitality and Tourism, as well as AutoCad.  École secondaire Confédération also offers two Specialist High Skills Majors in Hospitality/Tourism and Construction.

In 2006, 2007 and 2008, École secondaire Confederation qualified itself for the University of Ottawa Place à la Jeunesse provincial Marketing and Entrepreneurship competition.  Led by Professor Gilles Leblanc, it won and placed top 5 a number of times in the Entrepreneurship and Marketing divisions.  Throughout the years the teams consisted of Martin Rocheleau, Chris Paley, Rohan Wahdwa, Michael Kenworthy, Justin Dallaire, Yannick Lieber, Xavier Léveillé, and David Richard.  The team members received thousands of dollars in grants from the University of Ottawa.

Sports, Teams and Clubs

École secondaire Confédération boasts a number of Sports, Teams and Clubs in which students can join and participate.
 M/W Soccer Team
 M/W Basketball Team
 M/W Badminton Team
 M/W Tennis Team
 M/W Volleyball Team
 M/W Curling Team
 M/W Swim Team
 M/W Cross-Country Team
 M Hockey Team
 Ski/Snowboard Club
 Mountain Bike Club

In 2007, Confederation curling team beat out rival school E.L. Crosley in Zone finals, and once again in the SOSSA finals, allowing them to continue on to OFSAA.

Extracurricular activities

Since 2000 students have traveled throughout the world while attending Confédération.
 2000 – Dominican Republic
 2001 – Dominican Republic, Washington D.C.
 2002 – Dominican Republic, Hawaii, New Zealand and Australia
 2003 – Dominican Republic, New York City
 2004 – New York, Germany, Austria, Czech Republic, Hungary
 2005 – New York, Ottawa
 2006 – New York, Ottawa, Germany, Belgium, Austria, France
 2007 – New York, Ottawa, France, Austria, Italy, England, Switzerland
 2008 – New York, Ottawa, France, Germany, Guatemala
 2009 – Costa Rica
 2010 – France, Germany

See also
List of high schools in Ontario
Conseil scolaire Viamonde

References

External links
http://confederation.csviamonde.ca/
http://confederation.csviamonde.ca/index.php?school_id=34&menuOrder=1.7

Confederation
Confederation
Educational institutions established in 1968
Education in Welland